Isla del Carmen is an island of , located in the Gulf of California, in Loreto Municipality in the eastern portion of the state of Baja California Sur, Mexico. The island is protected within Loreto Bay National Park which is within the UNESCO "Islands and Protected Areas of the Gulf of California" Mexican World Heritage Site.

History
The tidal bay on the north east end of the island was the site of a salt producing facility run by the company Salinas del Pacifico SA de CV.  The submerged remnants of a loading dock are still present off shore of the bay.

Environment

Climate
The island has a desert climate similar to that of the Sonoran desert.

Conservation

Efforts to protect the island began in 1996 when the Vida Silvestre Organization, AC and Salinas del Pacifico SA de CV began a partnership to protect the native flora and fauna. Isla del Carmen supports many bird species, such as the brown pelican (Pelecanus occidentalis), the scissor-tailed flycatcher, magnificent frigatebird (Fregata magnificent) and the blue-footed booby (Sula nebouxii) as well as various reptiles and rodent mammals. The island provides nesting sites for seabirds such as the yellow-footed gull (Larus livens), the osprey (Pandion haliaetus) and the American oystercatcher (Haematopus palliatus).

A program to reestablish the once native Big Horn Sheep population on the island began in 1995.

References

External links
Frommers.com: Loreto (Baja California Sur)
 National Geographic.com: photo

Islands of Baja California Sur
Islands of the Gulf of California
Loreto Municipality (Baja California Sur)
Uninhabited islands of Mexico